Satanique (French for "of Satan" or "satanic") may refer to:

 Opération Satanique, a French plot to destroy Greenpeace's presence in the Pacific, see Sinking of the Rainbow Warrior
 Les Sataniques a series of etchings and aquatints published by Félicien Rops in 1882
 Satanique, a name given to the Storm petrel

See also
 Poeme Satanique, Opus 36, by Alexander Scriabin, see List of compositions by Alexander Scriabin
 Satanik, an Italian noir comic book 
 Satanism (disambiguation)